Flavour of Africa is the seventh studio album of Nigerian singer Flavour. It was released on December 4 2020.

Background 
The album which has a running time of 55 minutes is a 15-track music project which features Fally Ipupa, Tekno, Phyno, Biggie Igba, Beenie Man, Waga G and Larry Gaaga. It also has the guest act of Odumeje.
Production credits of the album goes to Masterkraft, Rotimi Keys, Selebobo, Spax, Stadic, Jonny Blaze, Marvio and DJ Tunez.

Singles 
Flavour released Looking Nyash as a single from the album. The song is about the allure of the African woman's backside, and Flavour celebrates and elevates it.

Reception 

Motolani Alake of Pulse Nigeria opined that the tracklists could have done with a few tweaks, and that the album could have also done without "Sawa Sawa", "Odoyewu" and "Omeihoma". He also noted that "Flavour is unrepentantly African on the album - its title is perfect." In a nutshell, he rated the album 6.9/10.

While reviewing the album, Dozie Asogwa and Chioma Onyefuosaonu of TooXclusive noted that Flavour's attempt to capture elements that show African diversity was well done, further saying that "For an intentional art created and a piece that might be able to transcend time, this album Flavour of Africa is rated a 8/10".

This Day in an article noted that a track from the album, "Looking Nyash", was getting negative reviews following a scene in which Flavour carried a naked lady on his shoulders.

Track listing

References 

2020 albums
Albums by Nigerian artists
Afrobeats albums
Flavour N'abania albums
2020 in Nigeria